Rabies (Kalevet) is a 2010 Israeli film written and directed by Aharon Keshales and Navot Papushado. It was marketed as "the first feature-length Israeli horror film".

Plot
A brother and sister are on the run, determined to keep their incestuous relationship a secret. While hiding deep in a forest, among many traps and landmines, the siblings are not alone: the park ranger, his wife and dog; four friends on their way to have a game of tennis; two police officers; and a serial killer. They all encounter each other in various ways, but not all of them will survive.

Cast

References

Further reading 
Ido Rosen. "National Fears in Israeli Horror Films." Jewish Film & New Media 8.1 (2020): 77–103.

Ido Rosen. National Fears in Israeli Horror Films. MA Thesis. Tel Aviv University, 2017.

External links

fearsmag.com interview with the filmmakers
Israeli Films: Rabies

2010 films
2010 horror films
2010s Hebrew-language films
2010s slasher films
Israeli horror films
Israeli slasher films
Backwoods slasher films
Films set in forests
Films set in Israel
Films shot in Israel
Incest in film
Rabies in popular culture